The 106th United States Congress was a meeting of the legislative branch of the United States federal government, composed of the United States Senate and the United States House of Representatives. It met in Washington, D.C., from January 3, 1999, to January 3, 2001, during the last two years of Bill Clinton's presidency. The apportionment of seats in the House of Representatives was based on the 1990 United States census. Both chambers maintained a Republican majority.

This is the most recent Congress with Republican senators from the states of Delaware (William Roth), Michigan (Spencer Abraham) and Washington (Slade Gorton), all of whom lost re-election in 2000.

Major events 

 January 7, 1999 – February 12, 1999: Impeachment trial of Bill Clinton
 March 24, 1999 – June 10, 1999: NATO bombing of Yugoslavia
 March 29, 1999: Dow Jones Industrial Average ended above 10,000 for the first time.
 April 20, 1999: Columbine High School massacre
 April 3, 2000: United States v. Microsoft: Federal court held Microsoft liable for anti-trust violations
 November 7, 2000: Presidential election, Senate election, House election
 November 7, 2000 – December 13, 2000: Presidential election, Florida recount, and Bush v. Gore litigation

Major legislation 

 May 21, 1999: Emergency Supplemental Appropriations Act,  (Kosovo operations)
 August 17, 1999: Water Resources Development Act of 1999, 
 October 26, 1999: Wireless Communications and Public Safety Act of 1999, Pub.L. 106-81
 November 12, 1999: Gramm-Leach-Bliley Financial Services Modernization Act, 
 November 29, 1999: American Inventors Protection Act,  (including Anticybersquatting Consumer Protection Act)
 December 9, 1999: Digital Theft Deterrence and Copyright Damages Improvement Act of 1999, Pub.L. 106-160
 December 14, 1999: Foster Care Independence Act, 
 March 14, 2000: Iran Nonproliferation Act of 2000, 
 April 5, 2000: Wendell H. Ford Aviation Investment and Reform Act for the 21st Century, 
 May 18, 2000: African Growth and Opportunity Act, 
 May 26, 2000: Hmong Veterans' Naturalization Act of 2000, Pub.L. 106-207
 May 26, 2000: Muhammad Ali Boxing Reform Act, Pub.L. 106-210
 June 22, 2000: Agricultural Risk Protection Act of 2000, Pub.L. 106-224
 June 30, 2000: Electronic Signatures in Global and National Commerce Act, 
 August 7, 2000: Oceans Act, 
 August 19, 2000: Global AIDS and Tuberculosis Relief Act of 2000, Pub.L. 106-264
 September 22, 2000: Religious Land Use and Institutionalized Persons Act, 
 October 10, 2000: U.S.-China Relations Act of 2000, Pub.L. 106-286
 October 17, 2000: Children's Health Act, 
 October 28, 2000: Victims of Trafficking and Violence Protection Act of 2000, 
 October 30, 2000: Robert T. Stafford Disaster Relief and Emergency Assistance Act, 
 October 30, 2000: Secure Rural Schools and Community Self-Determination Act of 2000, Pub.L. 106-393
 October 30, 2000: Child Citizenship Act of 2000, 
 November 1, 2000: Transportation Recall Enhancement, Accountability, and Documentation (TREAD) Act, Pub.L. 106-414
 November 22, 2000: Military Extraterritorial Jurisdiction Act of 2000, Pub.L. 106-523
 December 11, 2000: Water Resources Development Act of 2000, 
 December 19, 2000: DNA Analysis Backlog Elimination Act of 2000, Pub.L. 106-546
 December 21, 2000: Legal Immigration Family Equity Act, 
 December 21, 2000: Commodity Futures Modernization Act of 2000,  (as part of the Consolidated Appropriations Act, 2001)
 December 21, 2000: Shark Finning Prohibition Act, Pub.L. 106-557

Treaties considered 
 October 13, 1999: Comprehensive Nuclear Test Ban Treaty: Rejected

Party summary

Senate 

Membership changed with two deaths.

House of Representatives 
There were two resignations and three deaths.

Leadership

Senate 

 President: Al Gore (D)
 President pro tempore: Strom Thurmond (R)

Majority (Republican) leadership 

 Majority Leader: Trent Lott
 Majority Whip: Don Nickles
 Republican Conference Chairman: Connie Mack III
 Republican Conference Secretary: Paul Coverdell
 Republican Campaign Committee Chairman: Mitch McConnell
 Policy Committee Chairman: Larry Craig

Minority (Democratic) leadership 

 Minority Leader: Tom Daschle
 Minority Whip: Harry Reid
 Policy Committee Chairman: Byron Dorgan
 Democratic Conference Secretary: Barbara Mikulski
 Democratic Campaign Committee Chairman: Robert Torricelli
 Chief Deputy Whip: John Breaux

House of Representatives 

 Speaker: Dennis Hastert (R)

Majority (Republican) leadership 

 Majority Leader: Dick Armey
 Majority Whip: Tom DeLay
 Chief Deputy Whip: Roy Blunt
 Republican Conference Chairman: J. C. Watts
 Republican Conference Vice-Chairman: Tillie Fowler
 Republican Conference Secretary: Deborah Pryce
 Policy Committee Chairman: Christopher Cox
 Republican Campaign Committee Chairman: Tom Davis
 House Rules Committee Chairman: David Dreier

Minority (Democratic) leadership 

 Minority Leader: Dick Gephardt
 Minority Whip: David Bonior
 Chief Deputy Minority Whips: Chet Edwards, John Lewis, Ed Pastor & Maxine Waters
 Democratic Caucus Chairman: Martin Frost
 Democratic Caucus Vice Chairman: Bob Menendez
 Democratic Campaign Committee Chairman: Patrick J. Kennedy

Members 
Skip to House of Representatives, below

Senate 
In this Congress, Class 1 meant their term ended with this Congress, facing re-election in 2000; Class 2 meant their term began in the last Congress, facing re-election in 2002; and Class 3 meant their term began in this Congress, facing re-election in 2004.

Alabama 
 2. Jeff Sessions (R)
 3. Richard Shelby (R)

Alaska 
 2. Ted Stevens (R)
 3. Frank Murkowski (R)

Arizona 
 1. Jon Kyl (R)
 3. John McCain (R)

Arkansas 
 2. Tim Hutchinson (R)
 3. Blanche Lincoln (D)

California 
 1. Dianne Feinstein (D)
 3. Barbara Boxer (D)

Colorado 
 2. Wayne Allard (R)
 3. Ben Nighthorse Campbell (R)

Connecticut 
 1. Joe Lieberman (D)
 3. Chris Dodd (D)

Delaware 
 1. William Roth (R)
 2. Joe Biden (D)

Florida 
 1. Connie Mack III (R)
 3. Bob Graham (D)

Georgia 
 2. Max Cleland (D)
 3. Paul Coverdell (R), until July 18, 2000
 Zell Miller (D), from July 27, 2000

Hawaii 
 1. Daniel Akaka (D)
 3. Daniel Inouye (D)

Idaho 
 2. Larry Craig (R)
 3. Mike Crapo (R)

Illinois 
 2. Dick Durbin (D)
 3. Peter Fitzgerald (R)

Indiana 
 1. Richard Lugar (R)
 3. Evan Bayh (D)

Iowa 
 2. Tom Harkin (D)
 3. Chuck Grassley (R)

Kansas 
 2. Pat Roberts (R)
 3. Sam Brownback (R)

Kentucky 
 2. Mitch McConnell (R)
 3. Jim Bunning (R)

Louisiana 
 2. Mary Landrieu (D)
 3. John Breaux (D)

Maine 
 1. Olympia Snowe (R)
 2. Susan Collins (R)

Maryland 
 1. Paul Sarbanes (D)
 3. Barbara Mikulski (D)

Massachusetts 
 1. Ted Kennedy (D)
 2. John Kerry (D)

Michigan 
 1. Spencer Abraham (R)
 2. Carl Levin (D)

Minnesota 
 1. Rod Grams (R)
 2. Paul Wellstone (DFL)

Mississippi 
 1. Trent Lott (R)
 2. Thad Cochran (R)

Missouri 
 1. John Ashcroft (R)
 3. Kit Bond (R)

Montana 
 1. Conrad Burns (R)
 2. Max Baucus (D)

Nebraska 
 1. Bob Kerrey (D)
 2. Chuck Hagel (R)

Nevada 
 1. Richard Bryan (D)
 3. Harry Reid (D)

New Hampshire 
 2. Bob Smith (R)
 3. Judd Gregg (R)

New Jersey 
 1. Frank Lautenberg (D)
 2. Robert Torricelli (D)

New Mexico 
 1. Jeff Bingaman (D)
 2. Pete Domenici (R)

New York 
 1. Daniel Patrick Moynihan (D)
 3. Chuck Schumer (D)

North Carolina 
 2. Jesse Helms (R)
 3. John Edwards (D)

North Dakota 
 1. Kent Conrad (D-NPL)
 3. Byron Dorgan (D-NPL)

Ohio 
 1. Mike DeWine (R)
 3. George Voinovich (R)

Oklahoma 
 2. Jim Inhofe (R)
 3. Don Nickles (R)

Oregon 
 2. Gordon H. Smith (R)
 3. Ron Wyden (D)

Pennsylvania 
 1. Rick Santorum (R)
 3. Arlen Specter (R)

Rhode Island 
 1. John Chafee (R), until October 24, 1999
 Lincoln Chafee (R), from November 2, 1999
 2. Jack Reed (D)

South Carolina 
 2. Strom Thurmond (R)
 3. Fritz Hollings (D)

South Dakota 
 2. Tim Johnson (D)
 3. Tom Daschle (D)

Tennessee 
 1. Bill Frist (R)
 2. Fred Thompson (R)

Texas 
 1. Kay Bailey Hutchison (R)
 2. Phil Gramm (R)

Utah 
 1. Orrin Hatch (R)
 3. Bob Bennett (R)

Vermont 
 1. Jim Jeffords (R)
 3. Patrick Leahy (D)

Virginia 
 1. Chuck Robb (D)
 2. John Warner (R)

Washington 
 1. Slade Gorton (R)
 3. Patty Murray (D)

West Virginia 
 1. Robert Byrd (D)
 2. Jay Rockefeller (D)

Wisconsin 
 1. Herb Kohl (D)
 3. Russ Feingold (D)

Wyoming 
 1. Craig L. Thomas (R)
 2. Mike Enzi (R)

House of Representatives

Alabama 
 . Sonny Callahan (R)
 . Terry Everett (R)
 . Bob Riley (R)
 . Robert Aderholt (R)
 . Robert E. Cramer (D)
 . Spencer Bachus (R)
 . Earl Hilliard (D)

Alaska 
 . Don Young (R)

Arizona 
 . Matt Salmon (R)
 . Ed Pastor (D)
 . Bob Stump (R)
 . John Shadegg (R)
 . Jim Kolbe (R)
 . J. D. Hayworth (R)

Arkansas 
 . Robert Marion Berry (D)
 . Vic Snyder (D)
 . Asa Hutchinson (R)
 . Jay Dickey (R)

California 
 . Mike Thompson (D)
 . Wally Herger (R)
 . Doug Ose (R)
 . John Doolittle (R)
 . Robert Matsui (D)
 . Lynn Woolsey (D)
 . George Miller (D)
 . Nancy Pelosi (D)
 . Barbara Lee (D)
 . Ellen Tauscher (D)
 . Richard Pombo (R)
 . Tom Lantos (D)
 . Pete Stark (D)
 . Anna Eshoo (D)
 . Tom Campbell (R)
 . Zoe Lofgren (D)
 . Sam Farr (D)
 . Gary Condit (D)
 . George Radanovich (R)
 . Cal Dooley (D)
 . Bill Thomas (R)
 . Lois Capps (D)
 . Elton Gallegly (R)
 . Brad Sherman (D)
 . Buck McKeon (R)
 . Howard Berman (D)
 . James E. Rogan (R)
 . David Dreier (R)
 . Henry Waxman (D)
 . Xavier Becerra (D)
 . Matthew G. Martínez (D, switched to R July 27, 2000)
 . Julian Dixon (D), until December 8, 2000, vacant thereafter
 . Lucille Roybal-Allard (D)
 . Grace Napolitano (D)
 . Maxine Waters (D)
 . Steven Kuykendall (R)
 . Juanita Millender-McDonald (D)
 . Steve Horn (R)
 . Ed Royce (R)
 . Jerry Lewis (R)
 . Gary Miller (R)
 . George Brown Jr. (D), until July 15, 1999
 Joe Baca (D), from November 16, 1999
 . Ken Calvert (R)
 . Mary Bono (R)
 . Dana Rohrabacher (R)
 . Loretta Sanchez (D)
 . Christopher Cox (R)
 . Ron Packard (R)
 . Brian Bilbray (R)
 . Bob Filner (D)
 . Duke Cunningham (R)
 . Duncan L. Hunter (R)

Colorado 
 . Diana DeGette (D)
 . Mark Udall (D)
 . Scott McInnis (R)
 . Bob Schaffer (R)
 . Joel Hefley (R)
 . Tom Tancredo (R)

Connecticut 
 . John B. Larson (D)
 . Sam Gejdenson (D)
 . Rosa DeLauro (D)
 . Chris Shays (R)
 . James H. Maloney (D)
 . Nancy Johnson (R)

Delaware 
 . Mike Castle (R)

Florida 
 . Joe Scarborough (R)
 . Allen Boyd (D)
 . Corrine Brown (D)
 . Tillie Fowler (R)
 . Karen Thurman (D)
 . Cliff Stearns (R)
 . John Mica (R)
 . Bill McCollum (R)
 . Michael Bilirakis (R)
 . Bill Young (R)
 . Jim Davis (D)
 . Charles T. Canady (R)
 . Dan Miller (R)
 . Porter Goss (R)
 . Dave Weldon (R)
 . Mark Foley (R)
 . Carrie Meek (D)
 . Ileana Ros-Lehtinen (R)
 . Robert Wexler (D)
 . Peter Deutsch (D)
 . Lincoln Diaz-Balart (R)
 . Clay Shaw (R)
 . Alcee Hastings (D)

Georgia 
 . Jack Kingston (R)
 . Sanford Bishop (D)
 . Mac Collins (R)
 . Cynthia McKinney (D)
 . John Lewis (D)
 . Johnny Isakson (R), from February 23, 1999
 . Bob Barr (R)
 . Saxby Chambliss (R)
 . Nathan Deal (R)
 . Charlie Norwood (R)
 . John Linder (R)

Hawaii 
 . Neil Abercrombie (D)
 . Patsy Mink (D)

Idaho 
 . Helen Chenoweth (R)
 . Mike Simpson (R)

Illinois 
 . Bobby Rush (D)
 . Jesse Jackson Jr. (D)
 . William Lipinski (D)
 . Luis Gutierrez (D)
 . Rod Blagojevich (D)
 . Henry Hyde (R)
 . Danny K. Davis (D)
 . Philip Crane (R)
 . Jan Schakowsky (D)
 . John Porter (R)
 . Jerry Weller (R)
 . Jerry Costello (D)
 . Judy Biggert (R)
 . Dennis Hastert (R)
 . Thomas W. Ewing (R)
 . Don Manzullo (R)
 . Lane Evans (D)
 . Ray LaHood (R)
 . David D. Phelps (D)
 . John Shimkus (R)

Indiana 
 . Pete Visclosky (D)
 . David M. McIntosh (R)
 . Tim Roemer (D)
 . Mark Souder (R)
 . Steve Buyer (R)
 . Dan Burton (R)
 . Edward A. Pease (R)
 . John Hostettler (R)
 . Baron Hill (D)
 . Julia Carson (D)

Iowa 
 . Jim Leach (R)
 . Jim Nussle (R)
 . Leonard Boswell (D)
 . Greg Ganske (R)
 . Tom Latham (R)

Kansas 
 . Jerry Moran (R)
 . Jim Ryun (R)
 . Dennis Moore (D)
 . Todd Tiahrt (R)

Kentucky 
 . Ed Whitfield (R)
 . Ron Lewis (R)
 . Anne Northup (R)
 . Ken Lucas (D)
 . Hal Rogers (R)
 . Ernie Fletcher (R)

Louisiana 
 . Bob Livingston (R), until March 1, 1999
 David Vitter (R), from May 29, 1999
 . William J. Jefferson (D)
 . Billy Tauzin (R)
 . Jim McCrery (R)
 . John Cooksey (R)
 . Richard H. Baker (R)
 . Chris John (D)

Maine 
 . Tom Allen (D)
 . John Baldacci (D)

Maryland 
 . Wayne Gilchrest (R)
 . Bob Ehrlich (R)
 . Ben Cardin (D)
 . Albert Wynn (D)
 . Steny Hoyer (D)
 . Roscoe Bartlett (R)
 . Elijah Cummings (D)
 . Connie Morella (R)

Massachusetts 
 . John Olver (D)
 . Richard Neal (D)
 . Jim McGovern (D)
 . Barney Frank (D)
 . Marty Meehan (D)
 . John F. Tierney (D)
 . Ed Markey (D)
 . Mike Capuano (D)
 . Joe Moakley (D)
 . Bill Delahunt (D)

Michigan 
 . Bart Stupak (D)
 . Peter Hoekstra (R)
 . Vern Ehlers (R)
 . David Lee Camp (R)
 . James A. Barcia (D)
 . Fred Upton (R)
 . Nick Smith (R)
 . Debbie Stabenow (D)
 . Dale Kildee (D)
 . David Bonior (D)
 . Joe Knollenberg (R)
 . Sander Levin (D)
 . Lynn N. Rivers (D)
 . John Conyers (D)
 . Carolyn Cheeks Kilpatrick (D)
 . John Dingell (D)

Minnesota 
 . Gil Gutknecht (R)
 . David Minge (DFL)
 . Jim Ramstad (R)
 . Bruce Vento (DFL), until October 10, 2000, vacant thereafter
 . Martin Olav Sabo (DFL)
 . Bill Luther (DFL)
 . Collin Peterson (DFL)
 . Jim Oberstar (DFL)

Mississippi 
 . Roger Wicker (R)
 . Bennie Thompson (D)
 . Chip Pickering (R)
 . Ronnie Shows (D)
 . Gene Taylor (D)

Missouri 
 . Bill Clay (D)
 . Jim Talent (R)
 . Dick Gephardt (D)
 . Ike Skelton (D)
 . Karen McCarthy (D)
 . Pat Danner (D)
 . Roy Blunt (R)
 . Jo Ann Emerson (R)
 . Kenny Hulshof (R)

Montana 
 . Rick Hill (R)

Nebraska 
 . Doug Bereuter (R)
 . Lee Terry (R)
 . Bill Barrett (R)

Nevada 
 . Shelley Berkley (D)
 . Jim Gibbons (R)

New Hampshire 
 . John E. Sununu (R)
 . Charles Bass (R)

New Jersey 
 . Rob Andrews (D)
 . Frank LoBiondo (R)
 . H. James Saxton (R)
 . Chris Smith (R)
 . Marge Roukema (R)
 . Frank Pallone (D)
 . Bob Franks (R)
 . Bill Pascrell (D)
 . Steve Rothman (D)
 . Donald M. Payne (D)
 . Rodney Frelinghuysen (R)
 . Rush Holt Jr. (D)
 . Bob Menendez (D)

New Mexico 
 . Heather Wilson (R)
 . Joe Skeen (R)
 . Tom Udall (D)

New York 
 . Michael Forbes (R), switched to (D) July 17, 1999
 . Rick Lazio (R)
 . Peter T. King (R)
 . Carolyn McCarthy (D)
 . Gary Ackerman (D)
 . Gregory Meeks (D)
 . Joe Crowley (D)
 . Jerry Nadler (D)
 . Anthony Weiner (D)
 . Edolphus Towns (D)
 . Major Owens (D)
 . Nydia Velázquez (D)
 . Vito Fossella (R)
 . Carolyn Maloney (D)
 . Charles Rangel (D)
 . José E. Serrano (D)
 . Eliot Engel (D)
 . Nita Lowey (D)
 . Sue W. Kelly (R)
 . Benjamin Gilman (R)
 . Michael R. McNulty (D)
 . John E. Sweeney (R)
 . Sherwood Boehlert (R)
 . John M. McHugh (R)
 . James T. Walsh (R)
 . Maurice Hinchey (D)
 . Thomas M. Reynolds (R)
 . Louise Slaughter (D)
 . John J. LaFalce (D)
 . Jack Quinn (R)
 . Amo Houghton (R)

North Carolina 
 . Eva Clayton (D)
 . Bob Etheridge (D)
 . Walter B. Jones Jr. (R)
 . David Price (D)
 . Richard Burr (R)
 . Howard Coble (R)
 . Mike McIntyre (D)
 . Robin Hayes (R)
 . Sue Myrick (R)
 . Cass Ballenger (R)
 . Charles H. Taylor (R)
 . Mel Watt (D)

North Dakota 
 . Earl Pomeroy (D-NPL)

Ohio 
 . Steve Chabot (R)
 . Rob Portman (R)
 . Tony P. Hall (D)
 . Mike Oxley (R)
 . Paul Gillmor (R)
 . Ted Strickland (D)
 . Dave Hobson (R)
 . John Boehner (R)
 . Marcy Kaptur (D)
 . Dennis Kucinich (D)
 . Stephanie Tubbs Jones (D)
 . John Kasich (R)
 . Sherrod Brown (D)
 . Thomas C. Sawyer (D)
 . Deborah Pryce (R)
 . Ralph Regula (R)
 . James Traficant (D)
 . Bob Ney (R)
 . Steve LaTourette (R)

Oklahoma 
 . Steve Largent (R)
 . Tom Coburn (R)
 . Wes Watkins (R)
 . J. C. Watts (R)
 . Ernest Istook (R)
 . Frank Lucas (R)

Oregon 
 . David Wu (D)
 . Greg Walden (R)
 . Earl Blumenauer (D)
 . Peter DeFazio (D)
 . Darlene Hooley (D)

Pennsylvania 
 . Bob Brady (D)
 . Chaka Fattah (D)
 . Robert A. Borski Jr. (D)
 . Ron Klink (D)
 . John E. Peterson (R)
 . Tim Holden (D)
 . Curt Weldon (R)
 . James C. Greenwood (R)
 . Bud Shuster (R)
 . Don Sherwood (R)
 . Paul Kanjorski (D)
 . John Murtha (D)
 . Joe Hoeffel (D)
 . William J. Coyne (D)
 . Pat Toomey (R)
 . Joe Pitts (R)
 . George Gekas (R)
 . Mike Doyle (D)
 . William F. Goodling (R)
 . Frank Mascara (D)
 . Phil English (R)

Rhode Island 
 . Patrick J. Kennedy (D)
 . Robert Weygand (D)

South Carolina 
 . Mark Sanford (R)
 . Floyd Spence (R)
 . Lindsey Graham (R)
 . Jim DeMint (R)
 . John Spratt (D)
 . Jim Clyburn (D)

South Dakota 
 . John Thune (R)

Tennessee 
 . Bill Jenkins (R)
 . Jimmy Duncan (R)
 . Zach Wamp (R)
 . Van Hilleary (R)
 . Bob Clement (D)
 . Bart Gordon (D)
 . Ed Bryant (R)
 . John S. Tanner (D)
 . Harold Ford Jr. (D)

Texas 
 . Max Sandlin (D)
 . Jim Turner (D)
 . Sam Johnson (R)
 . Ralph Hall (D)
 . Pete Sessions (R)
 . Joe Barton (R)
 . Bill Archer (R)
 . Kevin Brady (R)
 . Nick Lampson (D)
 . Lloyd Doggett (D)
 . Chet Edwards (D)
 . Kay Granger (R)
 . Mac Thornberry (R)
 . Ron Paul (R)
 . Rubén Hinojosa (D)
 . Silvestre Reyes (D)
 . Charles Stenholm (D)
 . Sheila Jackson-Lee (D)
 . Larry Combest (R)
 . Charlie Gonzalez (D)
 . Lamar Smith (R)
 . Tom DeLay (R)
 . Henry Bonilla (R)
 . Martin Frost (D)
 . Ken Bentsen (D)
 . Dick Armey (R)
 . Solomon P. Ortiz (D)
 . Ciro Rodriguez (D)
 . Gene Green (D)
 . Eddie Bernice Johnson (D)

Utah 
 . James V. Hansen (R)
 . Merrill Cook (R)
 . Chris Cannon (R)

Vermont 
 . Bernie Sanders (I)

Virginia 
 . Herbert H. Bateman (R), until September 11, 2000, vacant thereafter
 . Owen B. Pickett (D)
 . Bobby Scott (D)
 . Norman Sisisky (D)
 . Virgil Goode (D, switched to I January 27, 2000)
 . Bob Goodlatte (R)
 . Thomas J. Bliley Jr. (R)
 . Jim Moran (D)
 . Rick Boucher (D)
 . Frank Wolf (R)
 . Tom Davis (R)

Washington 
 . Jay Inslee (D)
 . Jack Metcalf (R)
 . Brian Baird (D)
 . Doc Hastings (R)
 . George Nethercutt (R)
 . Norm Dicks (D)
 . Jim McDermott (D)
 . Jennifer Dunn (R)
 . Adam Smith (D)

West Virginia 
 . Alan Mollohan (D)
 . Bob Wise (D)
 . Nick Rahall (D)

Wisconsin 
 . Paul Ryan (R)
 . Tammy Baldwin (D)
 . Ron Kind (D)
 . Jerry Kleczka (D)
 . Tom Barrett (D)
 . Tom Petri (R)
 . Dave Obey (D)
 . Mark Andrew Green (R)
 . Jim Sensenbrenner (R)

Wyoming 
 . Barbara Cubin (R)

Non-voting members 
 . Eni Faleomavaega (D)
 . Eleanor Holmes Norton (D)
 . Robert A. Underwood (D)
 . Carlos Romero Barceló (Resident Commissioner) (D/PNP)
 . Donna Christian-Christensen (D)

Changes in membership

Senate 

|-
| Rhode Island(1)
|  nowrap | John Chafee (R)
| Died October 24, 1999.Successor appointed on November 2, 1999 and later elected for a full six-year term.
|  nowrap | Lincoln Chafee (R)
| November 2, 1999
|-
| Georgia(3)
|  nowrap | Paul Coverdell (R)
| Died July 18, 2000.Successor appointed on July 24, 2000 and later elected to finish the term.
|  nowrap | Zell Miller (D)
| July 24, 2000
|}

House of Representatives 

|-
| 
|  | Vacant
| data-sort-value="January 3, 1999" | Newt Gingrich (R) resigned January 3, 1999.Successor elected February 23, 1999.
| data-sort-value="Isakson Johnny"  | Johnny Isakson (R)
| February 23, 1999
|-
| 
| data-sort-value="Livingston Bob"  | Bob Livingston (R)
| data-sort-value="March 1, 1999" | Resigned March 1, 1999.Successor elected May 29, 1999.
| data-sort-value="Vitter David"  | David Vitter (R)
| May 29, 1999
|-
| 
| data-sort-value="Brown George"  | George Brown Jr. (D)
| data-sort-value="July 15, 1999" | Died July 15, 1999.Successor elected November 16, 1999.
| data-sort-value="Baca Joe"  | Joe Baca (D)
| November 16, 1999
|-
| 
| data-sort-value="Forbes Michael"  | Michael Forbes (R)
| data-sort-value="July 17, 1999" | Changed political affiliation July 17, 1999.
| data-sort-value="Forbes Michael"  | Michael Forbes (D)
| July 17, 1999
|-
| 
| data-sort-value="Goode Virgil"  | Virgil Goode (D)
| data-sort-value="January 27, 2000" | Changed party affiliation January 27, 2000.
| data-sort-value="Goode Virgil"  | Virgil Goode (I)
| January 27, 2000
|-
| 
| data-sort-value="Matthew Martínez"  | Matthew G. Martínez (D)
| data-sort-value="July 27, 2000" | Changed party affiliation July 27, 2000.
| data-sort-value="Martínez Matthew"  | Matthew G. Martínez (R)
| July 27, 2000
|-
| 
| data-sort-value="Bateman Herbert"  | Herbert H. Bateman (R)
| data-sort-value="September 11, 2000" | Died September 11, 2000.
| colspan=2 rowspan=3 | Seat vacant until next Congress
|-
| 
| data-sort-value="Vento Bruce"  | Bruce Vento (D)
| data-sort-value="October 10, 2000" | Died October 10, 2000.
|-
| 
| data-sort-value="Dixon Julian"  | Julian Dixon (D)
| data-sort-value="December 8, 2000" | Died December 8, 2000.
|}

Committees 
For members (House and Senate) of the committees and their assignments, go into the Official Congressional Directory at the bottom of the article and click on the link (1 link), in the directory after the pages of terms of service, you will see the committees of the Senate, House (Standing with Subcommittees, Select and Special) and Joint and after the committee pages, you will see the House/Senate committee assignments in the directory, on the committees section of the House and Senate in the Official Congressional Directory, the committee's members on the first row on the left side shows the chairman of the committee and on the right side shows the ranking member of the committee.

Senate 

 Aging (Special) (Chair: Chuck Grassley)
 Agriculture, Nutrition and Forestry (Chair: Richard Lugar)
 Forestry, Conservation and Rural Revitalization (Chair: Larry Craig)
 Marketing Inspection and Product Promotion (Chair: Paul Coverdell)
 Production and Price Competitiveness (Chair: Pat Roberts)
 Research, Nutrition and General Legislation (Chair: Peter Fitzgerald)
 Appropriations (Chair: Ted Stevens)
 Agriculture, Rural Development and Related Agencies (Chair: Thad Cochran)
 Commerce, Justice, State and the Judiciary (Chair: Judd Gregg)
 Defense (Chair: Ted Stevens)
 District of Columbia (Chair: Kay Bailey Hutchison)
 Energy and Water Development (Chair: Pete Domenici)
 Foreign Operations (Chair: Mitch McConnell)
 Interior (Chair: Slade Gorton)
 Labor, Health, Human Services and Education (Chair: Arlen Specter)
 Legislative Branch (Chair: Robert F. Bennett)
 Military Construction (Chair: Conrad Burns)
 Transportation (Chair: Richard Shelby)
 Treasury and General Government (Chair: Ben Nighthorse Campbell)
 VA, HUD and Independent Agencies (Chair: Kit Bond)
 Armed Services (Chair: John Warner)
 Airland (Chair: Rick Santorum)
 Emerging Threats and Capabilities (Chair: Pat Roberts)
 Personnel (Chair: Wayne Allard)
 Readiness and Management Support (Chair: Jim Inhofe)
 Seapower (Chair: Olympia Snowe)
 Strategic (Chair: Bob Smith)
 Banking, Housing and Urban Affairs (Chair: Phil Gramm)
 Economic Policy (Chair: Connie Mack III)
 Financial Institutions (Chair: Robert F. Bennett, Vice Chair: Chuck Hagel)
 Housing and Transportation (Chair: Wayne Allard, Vice Chair: Rick Santorum)
 International Trade and Finance (Chair: Mike Enzi, Vice Chair: Mike Crapo)
 Securities (Chair: Rod Grams, Vice Chair: Jim Bunning)
 Budget (Chair: Pete Domenici)
 Commerce, Science and Transportation (Chair: John McCain)
 Aviation (Chair: Slade Gorton)
 Communications (Chair: Conrad Burns)
 Consumer Affairs, Foreign Commerce and Tourism (Chair: John Ashcroft)
 Manufacturing and Competitiveness (Chair: Spencer Abraham)
 Oceans and Fisheries (Chair: Olympia Snowe)
 Surface Transportation and Merchant Marine (Chair: Bill Frist)
 Energy and Natural Resources (Chair: Frank Murkowski)
 Energy Research, Development, Production and Regulation (Chair: Don Nickles, Vice Chair: Pete Domenici)
 Forests and Public Land Management (Chair: Larry Craig, Vice Chair: Conrad Burns)
 National Parks, Historic Preservation and Recreation (Chair: Craig L. Thomas, Vice Chair: Ben Nighthorse Campbell)
 Water and Power (Chair: Gordon H. Smith, Vice Chair: Slade Gorton)
 Environment and Public Works (Chair: Bob Smith)
 Clean Air, Wetlands, Private Property and Nuclear Safety (Chair: Jim Inhofe)
 Fisheries, Wildlife, and Drinking Water (Chair: Mike Crapo)
 Superfund, Waste Control and Risk Assessment (Chair: Bob Smith)
 Transportation and Infrastructure (Chair: George Voinovich)
 Ethics (Select) (Chair: Pat Roberts)
 Finance (Chair: William V. Roth Jr.)
 Health Care (Chair: John Chafee)
 International Trade (Chair: Chuck Grassley)
 Long-Term Growth and Debt Reduction (Chair: Frank Murkowski)
 Social Security and Family Policy (Chair: Don Nickles)
 Taxation and IRS Oversight (Chair: Orrin Hatch)
 Foreign Relations (Chair: Jesse Helms)
 African Affairs (Chair: Bill Frist)
 East Asian and Pacific Affairs (Chair: Craig L. Thomas)
 European Affairs (Chair: Gordon H. Smith)
 International Economic Policy, Export and Trade Promotion (Chair: Chuck Hagel)
 International Operations (Chair: Rod Grams)
 Near Eastern and South Asian Affairs (Chair: Sam Brownback)
 Western Hemisphere, Peace Corps, Narcotics and Terrorism (Chair: Paul Coverdell)
 Governmental Affairs (Chair: Fred Thompson)
 International Security, Proliferation and Federal Services (Chair: Thad Cochran)
 Oversight of Government Management, Restructing and the District of Columbia (Chair: George Voinovich)
 Permanent Subcommittee on Investigations (Chair: Susan Collins)
 Indian Affairs (Select) (Chair: Ben Nighthorse Campbell)
 Intelligence (Select) (Chair: Richard Shelby)
 Health, Education, Labor and Pensions (Chair: Jim Jeffords)
 Children and Families (Chair: Judd Gregg)
 Public Health (Chair: Bill Frist)
 Aging (Chair: Mike DeWine)
 Employment, Safety and Training (Chair: Mike Enzi)
 Judiciary (Chair: Orrin Hatch)
 Administrative Oversight and the Courts (Chair: Chuck Grassley)
 Antitrust, Business Rights and Competition (Chair: Mike DeWine)
 Constitution, Federalism and Property Rights (Chair: John Ashcroft)
 Criminal Justice Oversight (Chair: Strom Thurmond)
 Immigration (Chair: Spencer Abraham)
 Technology, Terrorism and Government Information (Chair: Jon Kyl)
 Youth Violence (Chair: Jeff Sessions)
 Rules and Administration (Chair: Mitch McConnell)
 Small Business (Chair: Kit Bond)
 Veterans' Affairs (Chair: Arlen Specter)

House of Representatives 

 Agriculture (Chair: Larry Combest, Vice Chair: Bill Barrett)
 Department Operations, Oversight, Nutrition and Forestry (Chair: Bob Goodlatte, Vice Chair: Thomas W. Ewing)
 General Farm Commodities, Resource Conservation and Credit (Chair: Bill Barrett, Vice Chair: John A. Boehner)
 Livestock and Horticulture (Chair: Richard Pombo, Vice Chair: John A. Boehner)
 Risk Management, Research and Specialty Crops (Chair: Thomas W. Ewing, Vice Chair: Bill Barrett)
 Appropriations (Chair: Bill Young)
 Agriculture, Rural Development, Food and Drug Administration and Related Agencies (Chair: Joe Skeen)
 Commerce, Justice, State and Judiciary (Chair: Hal Rogers)
 Defense (Chair: Jerry Lewis)
 District of Columbia (Chair: Ernest J. Istook)
 Energy and Water Development (Chair: Ron Packard)
 Foreign Operations, Export Financing and Related Programs (Chair: Sonny Callahan)
 Interior (Chair: Ralph Regula)
 Labor, Health, Human Services and Education (Chair: John Edward Porter)
 Legislative (Chair: Charles H. Taylor)
 Military Construction (Chair: David L. Hobson)
 Transportation (Chair: Frank Wolf)
 Treasury, Postal Service and General Government (Chair: Jim Kolbe)
 VA-HUD Independent Agencies (Chair: James T. Walsh)
 Armed Services (Chair: Floyd Spence, Vice Chair: Bob Stump)
 Military Installations and Facilities (Chair: Joel Hefley)
 Military Personnel (Chair: Steve Buyer)
 Military Procurement (Chair: Duncan L. Hunter)
 Military Readiness (Chair: Herbert Bateman, Vice Chair: Walter B. Jones Jr.)
 Military Research and Development (Chair: Curt Weldon)
 Special Oversight Panel on Morale, Welfare and Recreation (Chair: John M. McHugh, Vice Chair: Bob Riley)
 Special Oversight Panel on the Merchant Marine (Chair: Herbert Bateman)
 Banking and Financial Services (Chair: Jim Leach, Vice Chair: Steven T. Kuykendall)
 Capital Markets, Securities and Government Sponsored Enterprises (Chair: Richard Baker, Vice Chair: Frank D. Lucas)
 Domestic and International Monetary Policy (Chair: Spencer Bachus, Vice Chair: Ron Paul)
 Financial Institutions and Consumer Credit (Chair: Marge Roukema, Vice Chair: Bill McCollum)
 General Oversight and Investigations (Chair: Peter T. King, Vice Chair: Steven C. LaTourette)
 Housing and Community Opportunity (Chair: Rick Lazio, Vice Chair: Robert W. Ney)
 Budget (Chair: John Kasich)
 Commerce (Chair: Thomas J. Bliley Jr., Vice Chair: Paul E. Gillmor)
 Energy and Power (Chair: Joe Barton, Vice Chair: Cliff Stearns)
 Finance and Hazardous Materials (Chair: Mike Oxley, Vice Chair: Billy Tauzin)
 Health and the Environment (Chair: Michael Bilirakis, Vice Chair: Tom Coburn)
 Oversight and Investigations (Chair: Fred Upton, Vice Chair: Richard Burr)
 Telecommunications, Trade and Consumer Protection (Chair: Billy Tauzin, Vice Chair: Mike Oxley)
 Education and the Workforce (Chair: William F. Goodling, Vice Chair: William F. Goodling)
 Employer-Employee Relations (Chair: John A. Boehner, Vice Chair: Ernie Fletcher)
 Workforce Protections (Chair: Cass Ballenger, Vice Chair: Bill Barrett)
 Oversight and Investigations (Chair: Peter Hoekstra. Vice Chair: Charles W. Norwood Jr.)
 Postsecondary Education, Training and Life-Long Learning (Chair: Buck McKeon, Vice Chair: Lindsey O. Graham)
 Early Childhood, Youth and Families (Chair: Michael Castle, Vice Chair: Bob Schaffer)
 Government Reform (Chair: Dan Burton, Vice Chair: Steve LaTourette)
 Census (Chair: Dan Miller, Vice Chair: John T. Doolittle)
 Civil Service (Chair: Joe Scarborough, Vice Chair: Asa Hutchinson)
 Criminal Justice, Drug Policy and Human Resources (Chair: John Mica, Vice Chair: Bob Barr)
 District of Columbia (Chair: Richard Baker, Vice Chair: Connie Morella)
 Government Management, Information and Technology (Chair: Stephen Horn, Vice Chair: Judy Biggert)
 National Economic Growth, Natural Resources and Regulatory Affairs (Chair: David M. McIntosh, Vice Chair: Paul Ryan)
 National Security, Veterans' Affairs and International Relations (Chair: Christopher Shays, Vice Chair: Mark E. Souder)
 Postal Service (Chair: John M. McHugh, Vice Chair: Mark Souder)
 House Administration (Chair: Bill Thomas)
 International Relations (Chair: Benjamin A. Gilman)
 Africa (Chair: Edward Royce)
 Asia and the Pacific (Chair: Doug Bereuter)
 International Operations and Human Rights (Chair: Chris Smith)
 Western Hemisphere (Chair: Elton Gallegly)
 International Economic Policy and Trade (Chair: Ileana Ros-Lehtinen)
 Judiciary (Chair: Henry J. Hyde)
 Commercial and Administrative Law (Chair: George Gekas)
 The Constitution (Chair: Charles T. Canady)
 Courts and Intellectual Property (Chair: Howard Coble)
 Crime (Chair: Bill McCollum)
 Immigration and Claims (Chair: Lamar Smith)
 Resources (Chair: Don Young)
 Energy and Mineral Resources (Chair: Barbara Cubin)
 Fisheries Conservation, Wildlife and Oceans (Chair: Jim Saxton)
 National Parks and Public Lands (Chair: James V. Hansen)
 Forests and Forest Health (Chair: Helen Chenoweth)
 Water and Power (Chair: John T. Doolittle)
 Rules (Chair: David Dreier, Vice Chair: Porter Goss)
 The Legislative Process (Chair: Porter Goss, Vice Chair: Deborah Pryce)
 The Rules and Organizations of the House (Chair: John Linder, Vice Chair: Lincoln Diaz-Balart)
 Science (Chair: Jim Sensenbrenner, Vice Chair: Vern Ehlers)
 Basic Research (Chair: Nick Smith, Vice Chair: Judy Biggert)
 Energy and the Environment (Chair: Ken Calvert, Vice Chair: Gary G. Miller)
 Space and Aeronautics (Chair: Dana Rohrabacher, Vice Chair: Dave Weldon)
 Technology (Chair: Constance Morella, Vice Chair: Gil Gutknecht)
 Small Business (Chair: Jim Talent)
 Empowerment (Chair: Joseph R. Pitts, Vice Chair: Jim DeMint)
 Government Programs and Oversight (Chair: Roscoe G. Bartlett, Vice Chair: Mary Bono)
 Regulatory Reform and Paperwork Reduction (Chair: Sue Kelly, Vice Chair: John Thune)
 Tax, Finance and Exports (Chair: Donald A. Manzullo, Vice Chair: Steve Chabot)
 Rural Enterprises, Business Opportunities and Special Small Business Problems (Chair: Frank LoBiondo, Vice Chair: Rick Hill)
 Standards of Official Conduct (Chair: Lamar S. Smith)
 Transportation and Infrastructure (Chair: Bud Shuster, Vice Chair: Tom Petri)
 Aviation (Chair: John J. Duncan Jr., Vice Chair: John E. Sweeney)
 Coast Guard and Maritime Transportation (Chair: Wayne T. Gilchrest, Vice Chair: Frank A. LoBiondo)
 Economic Development, Public Buildings, Hazardous Materials and Pipeline Transportation (Chair: Bob Franks, Vice Chair: John Cooksey)
 Ground Transportation (Chair: Tom Petri, Vice Chair: Bob Franks)
 Oversight, Investigations and Emergency Management (Chair: Tillie K. Fowler, Vice Chair: Lee Terry)
 Water Resources and Environment (Chair: Sherwood L. Boehlert, Vice Chair: Don Sherwood)
 Veterans' Affairs (Chair: Bob Stump, Vice Chair: Chris Smith)
 Health (Chair: Cliff Stearns, Vice Chair: Michael Bilirakis)
 Benefits (Chair: Jack Quinn, Vice Chair: J.D. Hayworth)
 Oversight and Investigations (Chair: Terry Everett)
 Ways and Means (Chair: William Reynolds Archer Jr.)
 Health (Chair: Bill Thomas)
 Human Resources (Chair: Nancy Johnson)
 Oversight (Chair: Amo Houghton)
 Social Security (Chair: E. Clay Shaw)
 Trade (Chair: Phil Crane)
 Whole

Joint committees 

 Economic (Chair: Sen. Connie Mack III, Vice Chair: Rep. Jim Saxton)
 Taxation (Chair: Rep. Bill Archer, Vice Chair: Sen. William V. Roth)
 The Library (Chair: Sen. Ted Stevens, Vice Chair: Rep. Bill Thomas)
 Printing (Chair: Bill Thomas, Vice Chair: Rep. Mitch McConnell)

Caucuses

Employees

Legislative branch agency directors 
 Architect of the Capitol: Alan M. Hantman
 Attending Physician of the United States Congress: John F. Eisold
 Comptroller General of the United States: David M. Walker
 Director of the Congressional Budget Office: June E. O'Neill, until January 29, 1999
 James Blum, January 29, 1999 - February 3, 1999
 Dan Crippen, from February 3, 1999
 Librarian of Congress: James H. Billington
 Public Printer of the United States: Michael F. DiMario

Senate 
 Chaplain: Lloyd John Ogilvie (Presbyterian)
 Curator: Diane K. Skvarla
 Historian: Richard A. Baker
 Parliamentarian: Bob Dove
 Secretary: Gary Lee Sisco
 Librarian: Greg Harness
 Secretary for the Majority: Elizabeth B. Letchworth
 Secretary for the Minority: Martin P. Paone
 Sergeant at Arms: James W. Ziglar

House of Representatives 
 Chaplain: James David Ford (Lutheran), until March 23, 2000
 Daniel P. Coughlin (Roman Catholic), from March 23, 2000
 Chief Administrative Officer: James M. Eagen III
 Clerk: Jeff Trandahl
 Reading Clerks:
 Mary Kevin Niland (D)
 Bob Berry (until 1999) along with Paul Hays (R)
 Inspector General: John W. Lainhart IV then Steven McNamara
 Parliamentarian: Charles W. Johnson
 Sergeant at Arms: Wilson Livingood

Exoneration of Charles Butler McVay III 
In October 2000, the United States Congress passed a Sense of Congress resolution that McVay's record should reflect that "he is exonerated for the loss of the USS Indianapolis." President Clinton also signed the resolution. which rightented the miscarriage of justice on Charles B. McVay III for the sinking of the USS Indianapolis in 30 July 1945 by Japanese submarine I-58 (1943)

See also 
 List of new members of the 106th Congress
 1998 United States elections (elections leading to this Congress)
 1998 United States Senate elections
 1998 United States House of Representatives elections
 2000 United States elections (elections during this Congress, leading to the next Congress)
 2000 United States presidential election
 2000 United States Senate elections
 2000 United States House of Representatives elections

Notes

References

External links 
 Biographical Directory of the United States Congress
 History, Art and Archives from the U.S. House of Representatives
 Statistics & Lists from the U.S. Senate
 Legislative information  from THOMAS at the Library of Congress